The Feaelloidea are a superfamily of pseudoscorpions with two families, the Feaellidae with a single genus, and the Pseudogarypidae with two.

References 

 Joel Hallan's Biology Catalog: Pseudoscorpionida

 
Arachnid superfamilies